Peace Army may refer to:
 Army of Peace, which was also known as "Peace Army"
 Women's Peace Army